Nistad is a surname. Notable people with the surname include:

Aline Nistad (1954–2017), Norwegian trombonist and music educator
Astrid Marie Nistad (born 1938), Norwegian politician
Clara Nistad (born 1996), Swedish badminton player
Einar Nistad (1932–2011), Norwegian retailer
Thore A. Nistad (born 1949), Norwegian politician
Wenche Nistad (born 1952), Norwegian businessperson and civil servant